The Manganhar are a community found in the desert of Rajasthan, India; mostly in the districts of Barmer and Jaisalmer. also found in the districts of Tharparkar and Sanghar in the bordering province of Sindh in Pakistan. They are known for various compositions describing stories from Hindu mythology, focused on the human nature and salvation. They along with the, Langha community, are known for their folk music. They are the groups of hereditary professional musicians, whose music has been supported by wealthy landlords and aristocrats for generations.

History and origin
The manganhars consider themselves descendants of the Rajputs and are renowned as folk musicians of the Thar desert. Their songs are passed on from generation to generation as a form of oral history of the desert. The traditional Jajman (patrons) of the manganhar are the locally dominant Rajput and Charan communities, while the Langha have a similar relationship with the Sindhi-Sipahi, a community of Muslim Rajputs. At times of birth, marriage or any family festivity for their Rajput patrons, the manganhar musicians sing songs of the desert and many specially composed songs to praise the patron and his family .

Present circumstances
In 1978, Jodhpur-based musician Komal Kothari provided the manganhars with institutional support, allowing them to sing outside the state for the first time. Currently, several manganhar groups tour internationally.

Instruments
Kamaicha
The 17-string khamaycha is a bowed instrument. Made of mango wood, its rounded resonator is covered with goat skin. Three of its strings are goat intestine while the other 14 strings are steel.

Khartaal
The khartaal is a kind of castanet made of teak. Its name is derived from "Khar", meaning hand, and "Taal", meaning rhythm.

Dholak
The dholak is a hand drum similar in timbre to a bongo. A dholak may have traditional lacing or turnbuckle tuning. The dholak has a simple membrane and a handle on the right hand side. The left hand membrane has a special coating on the inner surface. This coating is a mixture of tar, clay and sand (dholak masala) which lowers the pitch.

Notable people

 Mai Dhai, Pakistani manganhar folk singer
 Kachra Khan, a singer of the Managniar community of western Rajasthan
 Mame Khan, a folk singer
 Sakar Khan, Khamaicha player, Padmasree award winner
 Swaroop Khan, playback singer

References

External links
 manganhar.com
 "manganhar Magic" article by Poonam Goel
 "Rhythms of Rajasthan" Preservation Project
 "The manganhar Seduction" live show
 Smithsonian Folkways

Muslim communities of India
Social groups of Rajasthan
Muslim communities of Rajasthan
Social groups of Pakistan